Joshua Guy Coburn (born 6 December 2002) is an English footballer who plays as a forward for Bristol Rovers on loan from  club Middlesbrough.

Early life and education
Coburn was born in Bedale, North Yorkshire, and attended Bedale Primary School, Crakehall Primary School and Richmond School. He returned to his primary school in November 2021 to open a new sports facility at the school, alongside local MP and current Prime Minister, Rishi Sunak.

Career
After spending five years at Sunderland's academy, he joined Middlesbrough at under-16 level in September 2019, following his release by the aforementioned club whilst going through a growth spurt. He signed his first professional contract with the club in January 2021, and was named on the first team bench for the first time on 13 March 2021 for a 3–0 home win over Stoke City. He made his debut for the club as a substitute in a 2–1 win over Rotherham United on 21 April 2021. Coburn scored his first goal for the club in his next game with a "brilliant headed goal" in a 3–1 league win at home to Sheffield Wednesday on 24 April 2021. He scored once in 4 appearances in his debut season in professional football.

On 11 August 2021, he made his first start for Middlesbrough in a 3–0 EFL Cup defeat to Blackpool. He scored his first goal of the season in a 2–0 win over Peterborough United on 16 October 2021. He scored in successive fixtures against Luton Town and West Bromwich Albion in November 2021, the former coinciding with his full league debut. In January 2022, he signed a new contract with the club until 2025, with the option of a further year.

On 1 March 2022, he scored the winning goal in extra time in an FA Cup match against Tottenham Hotspur to take Middlesbrough through to the quarter-finals of the competition.

Loan to Bristol Rovers

On 1 September 2022, Coburn joined EFL League One club Bristol Rovers on loan for the 2022–23 season. Having suffered an injury on the opening day of the season, Coburn would stay with his parent club in the short-term to work on the rehab from this knee injury. On 4 October, Coburn made his debut for the club when he came on as a half-time substitute in a 2–0 EFL Trophy victory over Crystal Palace U21. Coburn made his league debut four days later, scoring the winner in a 2–1 victory over Cambridge United, Rovers' first league win for eight weeks. Coburn impressed during his first ten league appearances for the club, scoring five goals, with manager Joey Barton tipping him to go on to play for England. In December 2022, amid talk of a potential recall, Middlesbrough Head of Football Kieran Scott reiterated the plan was to allow Coburn to stay with Rovers until the end of the season as originally planned.

Career statistics

References

External links

2002 births
Living people
English footballers
People from Richmond, North Yorkshire
Footballers from North Yorkshire
Association football forwards
Middlesbrough F.C. players
Bristol Rovers F.C. players
English Football League players